Flaveria linearis, known as narrowleaf yellowtops, is a North American plant species of Flaveria within the family Asteraceae. It is native to Florida, Cuba, Bahamas, and the Yucatán Peninsula of Mexico.

Flaveria linearis  is a perennial herb up to 80 cm tall. One plant can produce sometimes as many as 150 small flower heads in a branching array. Each head contains 2-8 yellow disc flowers and sometimes a single yellow ray flower.

References

External links 
photo of herbarium specimen at Missouri Botanical Garden, collected near Palm Beach, Florida in 1895, isotype of Flaveria linearis var. latifolia

linearis
Flora of Florida
Flora of Cuba
Flora of the Bahamas
Flora of Yucatán
Plants described in 1816
Flora without expected TNC conservation status